is a Japanese footballer who plays as an attacking midfielder for DSK Shivajians F.C. in the I-League 2nd Division.

Career

Pune
After graduating from the Cerezo Osaka Academy Nishiguchi joined Moldovan Divizia Naţională side FC Olimpia where he played in 14 matches during the 2011–12 season and then made 2 starts for Olimpia at the beginning of the 2012–13 season before signing for Pune F.C. of the I-League in India. He made his debut for Pune FC during the 2012 Indian Federation Cup on 20 September 2012 in Pune's first match of the tournament against United Sikkim F.C. in which Nishiguchi came on as a 76th-minute substitute for Pierre Djidjia Douhou as Pune won 1–0. He then made his I-League debut on 8 October 2012 against ONGC F.C. at home at the Balewadi Sports Complex where he played for only 64 minutes before being replaced by Shanmugam Venkatesh in a game where Pune won 3–2. Nishiguchi then scored his first two goals for Pune FC in his second I-League game for the club on 11 October 2012 against Mumbai F.C. at the Balewadi Sports Complex in which he scored in the 7th and 51st minute as Pune won 3–2 again.

Career statistics

Club
Statistics accurate as of 12 October 2012

References

Japanese footballers
Japanese expatriate footballers
1988 births
Living people
I-League players
Japanese expatriate sportspeople in Moldova
Expatriate footballers in Moldova
Moldovan Super Liga players
CSF Bălți players
Japanese expatriate sportspeople in India
Expatriate footballers in India
Kansai University alumni
Association football midfielders